Queen Janghwa of the Naju O clan (Hangul: 장화왕후 오씨, Hanja: 莊和王后 吳氏; d.  934 or 943) was the second Goryeo queen consort through her marriage as the second wife of Wang Geon, its founder and became the mother of his heir and oldest son, King Hyejong.

Biography 
She is a descendant of the Chinese royal family who came to Korea in the age of the Three Kingdoms of Korea. One of her ancestors was Oh Cheom who came to Korea in the age of Jijeung of Silla. Oh Cheom had two sons and one daughter in Silla, but he decided to leave Silla. His younger son was too small to go back China with his father, so Oh Cheom left his younger son, Oh Eung in Silla. Oh Eung's descendant, Oh Da-ryeon helped Taejo to establish Goryeo. Queen Janghwa is daughter of Oh Da-ryeon.

Family 
 Father: Oh Da-ryeon (오다련)
 Mother: Lady Yeon Deok-gyo (연덕교)
 Husband: King Taejo of Goryeo (31 January 877 – 4 July 943) (고려 태조)
 Son: King Hyejong of Goryeo (912 – 23 October 945) (고려 혜종)
 Daughter-in-law: Queen Uihwa of the Jincheon Im clan (의화왕후 임씨)

In popular culture 
Portrayed by Yum Jung-ah in the 2000–2002 KBS1 TV Series Taejo Wang Geon.
Portrayed by Ban Hyo-jung in the 2002–2003 in the KBS TV Series The Dawn of the Empire.

References

External links
장화왕후 on Doosan Encyclopedia .

Year of birth unknown
10th-century deaths
Silla people
People from Naju
Korean people of Chinese descent
Naju O clan
Consorts of Taejo of Goryeo
Korean queens consort